Tiande (天德) may refer to:

Tiande, Liaoning, town in Xifeng County, Liaoning, China

Historical eras
Tiande (943–945), era name used by Wang Yanzheng, emperor of Min
Tiande (1149–1153), era name used by Wanyan Liang, emperor of Jin

People
Hong Daquan (19th century), titled Tian De, early leader of the Taiping Rebellion whose historicity is debated